Instant Khichdi is an Indian sitcom that aired on STAR One from 1 July 2005 to 7 August 2005. The series served as the second season of Khichdi franchise and a sequel to the show Khichdi, which aired on STAR Plus channel. The show has been made into a film: Khichdi: The Movie.

Plot
The series portrays the life of an eccentric Gujarati joint family living in Mumbai. The family is led by the elderly Tulsidas Parekh and consists of his offspring, who he acquired at a local carnival. The first season, particularly the initial episodes, focus on the idiosyncratic members of the family who are only united by their desire to separate from each other. Since the patriarch does not permit them to sell off their house and separate into nuclear families, they live on hoping that he changes his mind or passes away. Eventually, they move into a much larger house left behind by a deceased aunt.

-They become overnight millionaires when they discover oil in their older property. The second season portrays humorous depictions of a bourgeois family that is trying to settle itself into higher society with their new-found wealth. They live on in their own eccentric way, trying to ace the lives of the super-rich.

Cast
 Anang Desai as Tulsidas Parekh a.k.a. Babuji: Praful, Bharat, Raju, Heera and Meera's father; Hansa, Jayashree, Melissa and Bhavesh Kumar's father-in-law; Damyanti's widower; Tiwariben's son and Jackky and Chakki's grandfather
 Rajeev Mehta as Praful Tulsidas Parekh:Tulsidas and Damyanti's elder son; Hansa's husband; Bharat, Raju, Heera and Meera's elder brother and Chakki's father.
 Supriya Pathak as Hansa Praful Parekh: Praful's wife; Chandrakant's daughter; Himanshu's elder sister; Tulsidas's eldest daughter-in-law and Chakki's mother.
 Vandana Pathak as Jayshree Bharat Parekh:Tulsidas's widowed second daughter-in-law; Bharat's widow; Jignesh's elder sister and Jackky's mother.
 Jamnadas Majethia as Himanshu Chandrakant Seth: Hansa's younger brother; Behen Parminder's husband.
 Richa Bhadra as Chakki Praful Parekh:Hansa and Praful's daughter. Jackky's cousin and Tulsidas's granddaughter.
 Yash Mittal as Jackky Bharat Parekh: Jayashree and Bharat's son; Chakki's cousin and Tulsidas's grandson.
 Amit Varma as Raju Tulsidas Parekh 
 Tina Parekh as Melissa Raju Parekh
 Arya Rawal as Heera Tulsidas Parekh: Tulsidas's eldest daughter; Praful, Bharat, Raju and Meera's sister.
 Kamlesh Oza as Bhavesh Kumar
 Aatish Kapadia as Jignesh
 Gireesh Sahedev as Parminder Singh: Bhai Parminder and Behen Parminder's brother.
 Anokhi Srivastava as Parminder Himanshu Seth: Bhai Parminder and Parminder Singh's sister and Himanshu's wife.
 Sweety Nayak as Madhuri
 Lily Patel as Tiwariben Parekh a.k.a. Badi Maa
 Deepesh Shah as Inspector Dheeman (and various characters)
 Ami Trivedi as Mira Tulsidas Parekh (archived footage)

Guest appearances
 Delnaaz Irani as Shehnaaz
 Sachin Shroff as Pranay
 Disha Vakani as Nisha
 Kalpana Diwan as Jagdamba Maami (photo)
 Kishwer Merchantt as Rambha
 Shabnam Sayed as Kaamna
 Dinyar Contractor as Mr. Mehta
 Deven Bhojani as 'Vodka' Genie
 Smita Singh as Sandhya Devi
 Aanchal Dwivedi as Savitri 
 Shweta Kawatra as Cindy
 Manav Gohil as Wilson
 Chetan Hansraj as Rakesh
 Dimple Shah as Hetal
 Jignesh Joshi as Manish (and other characters)
 Cast of Sarabhai vs Sarabhai in the crossover episode

Awards and nominations

Indian Telly Awards 
Winner
 2005: Best Actor in a Comic Role ( Female ) - Supriya Pathak as Hansa
 2005: Best Child Artiste (Male) - Yash Mittal as Jacky

Nominated
 2005: Best Sitcom / Comedy Writer - Aatish Kapadia
 2005: Best Actor in a Comic Role (Female) - Vandana Pathak as Jayshree
 2005: Best Actor in Comic Role (Male) - Rajeev Mehta as Praful
 2005: Best Sitcom/Comedy Programme

References

External links
 Instant Khichdi official site on STAR One

Star One (Indian TV channel) original programming
Indian comedy television series
2005 Indian television series debuts
Television series about dysfunctional families
2005 Indian television series endings
Television shows adapted into films
Hats Off Productions